John Steinbacher (1925-2015) was an author and investigative reporter. His controversial book The Child Seducers was an attack on the state of education in America during the 1960s.

Background
He was born to Joseph Steinbacher and Catherine Matyok in Foley, Alabama on October 18, 1925. He was educated at the Pacific University in Oregon.

His book, The Child Seducers, was a best seller.

Steinbacher had been a teacher in his time. For a decade he taught at Californian public schools until 1967. Then from 1967 to 1969, he had been a social worker for Los Angeles County Social Service. He had also been a newsman, radio announcer and author. He was also a member of the New York Academy of Sciences, the American Medical Writers Association, and the American Society of Association Executives. As a reporter he had worked for the Anaheim Bulletin. He also wrote a column for the paper, "School and Family". He was also a contributor to the monthly conservative newspaper, The Educator.

In 1972, he wrote an article about John G. Schmitz, supportive of him, "Who Will Vote for Schmitz?" in the October 5 edition of the Kerrville Mountain Sun. By 1974 he was the director of the National Justice Foundation.

Sex education stance
In late March 1969, it was announced in The Los Angeles Times that the  Parental Rights Committee (PRC) would pay for four speakers opposing family life education to come and speak. It was narrowed down to just one speaker, Steinbacher. He was scheduled to speak on Monday, March 31, at San Marino High School's theater. At another event the following month, Steinbacher had criticized Boy Scouts and Girl Guides, saying that they were transmission belts for getting sex education into schools.

Releases
Steinbacher was an outspoken critic of sex education in America, and the organization USAID (U.S. Agency for International Development) in his book, The Child Seducers, which was published in 1970. The book was critical of the sex education programs in America.  
A record with the same title came out in 1969. It was produced by Anthony J. Hilder and Earl Stone for the World Christian Movement, and released on Hilder's American United label. In addition to Steinbacher's research for the album, the narration was provided by John Carradine.

Discography

7"
 John Steinbacher - Communism - Fact Records R-2104

12" Albums
 John Steinbacher  – It Comes Up Murder - American United AU-10x - 1967
 John Carradine  – The Child Seducers - American United AU-14 - 1969 
 John Steinbacher  – Bitter Harvest: A Documentary Drama From The Explosive Best Selling Book - I.S. Productions for Orange Tree Press, Inc. - 1970

Books
 It Comes Up Murder When the Obvious Become a Mystery - Carpenter's - 1967
 Senator Robert Francis Kennedy, the Man, the Mysticism, the Murder - Impact Publishers - 1968
 Bitter Harvest - Orange Tree Press - 1970
 The Child Seducers - Educator Publishers - 1970 
 John Schmitz and the American Party - Educator Publications - 1972 
 The Conspirators: Men Against God - Orange Tree Press - 1972
 An Inward Stillness and an Inward Healing - Cancer Federation - 1981 ISBN B00071I1R6
 Against all odds: The Cancer Federation's Triumphant History - 1993
 The Seven Deadly Sins and Why We Love Them - Cancer Federation - 1994
 Wayfarers of Fate: A Novel of the Spanish Civil War - Dorrance Publishing Company, Incorporated  - 2006 - , 9780805970494

References

1925 births
2015 deaths
Private detectives and investigators
Conservatism in the United States